Ambrose Battista De Paoli (August 19, 1934 – October 10, 2007) was an American prelate of the Catholic Church who worked in the diplomatic service of the Holy See.

Biography
De Paoli was born in Jeannette, Pennsylvania and was ordained a priest on December 18, 1960, for the Archdiocese of Miami, Florida.

He earned a doctorate in canon law at the Pontifical Lateran University.

To prepare for a diplomatic career he entered the Pontifical Ecclesiastical Academy in 1964. He entered the diplomatic corps in 1966.

On September 23, 1983, Pope John Paul II named him a titular bishop and Apostolic Pro-Nuncio to Sri Lanka. He was consecrated a bishop on November 20, 1983, by Cardinal Agostino Casaroli.

On February 6, 1988, Pope John Paul appointed him Apostolic Delegate to Southern Africa and Apostolic Pro-Nuncio to Lesotho. He was then given additional titles as the Delegation to Southern Africa was transformed into country-specific missions, including Apostolic Nuncio to Swaziland on April 17, 1993; Apostolic Delegate to Namibia and to Botswana on March 5, 1994; and Apostolic Nuncio to South Africa on June 25, 1994.

On November 11, 1997, he was named nuncio to Japan.

On December 18, 2004, he was named nuncio to Australia.

He died from complications of leukemia in Miami Beach, Florida, on October 10, 2007.

See also 

 Apostolic Nuncio
Peter Bryan Wells

Notes

External links
 Catholic Hierarchy: Archbishop Ambrose Battista De Paoli 
Archdiocese of Miami
Diplomatic relations of the Holy See

1934 births
2007 deaths
People from Westmoreland County, Pennsylvania
Religious leaders from Florida
20th-century American Roman Catholic titular bishops
Pontifical Ecclesiastical Academy alumni
Pontifical Lateran University alumni
Apostolic Nuncios to Sri Lanka
Apostolic Nuncios to South Africa
Apostolic Nuncios to Lesotho
Apostolic Nuncios to Eswatini
Apostolic Nuncios to Namibia
Apostolic Nuncios to Botswana
Apostolic Nuncios to Japan
Apostolic Nuncios to Australia
Catholics from Pennsylvania